
Georg Robert von Pasterwitz (7 June 1730 – 26 January 1803) was an Austrian composer and teacher. He was born in Bierhütten, near Passau. First educated at Niederaltaich, he entered the Benedictine monastery in Kremsmünster in 1749. He then enrolled at the University of Salzburg, studying theology, law and mathematics. It was during this time that he met Johann Ernst Eberlin, who became his music teacher. Pasterwitz completed his studies in 1759 and soon started teaching philosophy at the monastery's Ritterakademie, eventually rising to teach courses in mathematics, physics, economics, and political science; since about 1755 he was also active as composer, producing stage works for the monastery almost every year.

Between 1767 and 1783 Pasterwitz served as the monastery's choir director. Due to reforms started by Joseph II, he had to give up some of his duties and became instead the monastery's treasurer and eventually official representative, when it was threatened with dissolution in 1785. Pasterwitz died in 1803 in Kremsmünster, having served as dean of the Upper School there until 1801. Pasterwitz's surviving oeuvre comprises some 500 works, mostly liturgical pieces and dramatic works for the church. He composed a large number of short contrapuntal pieces for keyboard: 324 were published between 1790 and 1803, and were the only works published during the composer's lifetime. They show him as a competent master of both counterpoint and the keyboard. For the monastery, Pasterwitz regularly composed dramas and dozens of liturgical pieces: masses, offertories, vespers, etc.

List of works

Stage
 Mardochäus (drama), 1751
 Abul Granatae rex (comedy), 1755
 Jephtias (drama), 1758
 Joas (drama), 1759
 Athamas (Singspiel), 1774
 Samson (Singspiel), 1775
 Il Giuseppe riconosciuto, 1777
 Der wahre Vater, 1782
 other dramatic works

Sacred vocal
 Requiem (previously attributed to Michael Haydn)
 Terra tremuit for choir and orchestra
 14 masses, 83 graduals, 85 offertories, 11 vespers, 38 Magnificats, 40 Marian antiphons, 4 litanies, 4 Te Deums, 16 Advent arias, 24 Passion arias

Instrumental
 [24] Fughe, for organ or harpsichord, opp. 1–3 (Vienna, 1790–92)
 300 Themata und Versetten, for organ or piano, op. 4 (Vienna, 1803)
 22 orchestral minuets
 Variations for harpsichord

References
Altman Kellner, Pasterwitz, Georg [Robert] (von) page 213 in volume 19 of the New Grove Dictionary of Music and Musicians Second Edition edited by Stanley Sadie
David Black, Pasterwitz and Michael Haydn. Early Music 2008 36(1):174
Ernst Schlader: Georg Pasterwiz (1730-1803), Leben Wirken Werk, Saarbrücken 2011.

External links

Austrian people of German descent
Austrian Classical-period composers
People from Passau (district)
1730 births
1803 deaths
University of Salzburg alumni
Austrian Benedictines
Austrian male classical composers
19th-century male musicians